The Constitution Alteration (Industrial Employment) Bill 1946, was an unsuccessful proposal to alter the Australian Constitution to give the Commonwealth power to make laws regulating employment in industry. It was put to voters for approval in a referendum held on 28 September 1946. The proposals was narrowly rejected, with a minority of 1.80% in the fourth state, South Australia.

Question
Do you approve of the proposed law for the alteration of the Constitution entitled 'Constitution Alteration (Industrial Employment) 1946'?

The proposal was to insert into section 51 that the Parliament have power to make laws with respect to::(xxxiv.A.) Terms and conditions of employment in industry, but not so as to authorize any form of industrial conscription;

Results

Discussion
This was the sixth occasion in which the commonwealth sought power to regulate terms and conditions of employment, rather than using the conciliation and arbitration power, having been unsuccessful in 1911, 1913, 1919, 1926 and 1944.

For a referendum to approve an amendment of the constitution, it must ordinarily achieve a double majority: approved by a majority of states (i.e., four of the six states) as well as a majority of those voting nationwide. This was the third of five referendums to achieve an overall majority, but fail the requirement of a majority of states.

See also
Politics of Australia
History of Australia

References

Further reading
 Standing Committee on Legislative and Constitutional Affairs (1997) Constitutional Change: Select sources on Constitutional change in Australia 1901–1997 . Australian Government Printing Service, Canberra.
 Bennett, Scott (2003). Research Paper no. 11 2002–03: The Politics of Constitutional Amendment  Australian Department of the Parliamentary Library, Canberra.
 Australian Electoral Commission (2007) Referendum Dates and Results 1906 – Present AEC, Canberra.

Referendum (Industrial Employment)
1946 referendums
1946 (Industrial Employment)
Aftermath of World War II in Australia